Diaporthe nothofagi is a plant endophyte and occasionally a plant pathogen, first found on Nothofagus cunninghamii in Australia.

References

Further reading
Fan, Xin-Lei, et al. "Diaporthe rostrata, a novel ascomycete from Juglans mandshurica associated with walnut dieback." Mycological Progress 14.10 (2015): 1–8.
Gopal, K., et al. "Citrus Melanose (Diaporthe citri Wolf): A Review." Int. J. Curr. Microbiol. App. Sci 3.4 (2014): 113–124.
McKenzie, E. H. C., P. K. Buchanan, and P. R. Johnston. "Checklist of fungi on nikau palm (Rhopalostylis sapida and R. baueri var. cheesemanii), in New Zealand." New Zealand Journal of Botany 42.2 (2004): 335–355.

External links
MycoBank

Fungal plant pathogens and diseases
nothofagi